Little Italy is a general name for an ethnic enclave populated primarily by Italians or people of Italian ancestry, usually in an urban neighborhood.

Little Italy may also refer to:

 Little Italy (1921 film), an American comedy film directed by George Terwilliger and written by Tom McNamara and Peter Milne
 Little Italy (1978 film), an Italian "poliziottesco"-comedy film directed by Bruno Corbucci and the fourth chapter in the Nico Giraldi film series
 Little Italy (2018 film), an English-language romantic comedy film starring Emma Roberts and Hayden Christensen

See also
 Maggiano's Little Italy
 In Little Italy, a 1909 film directed by D. W. Griffith
 Lil Italy, an American rapper